This is a list of English words that are probably of modern Scandinavian origin. This list excludes words borrowed directly from Old Norse; for those, see list of English words of Old Norse origin.

English words of Scandinavian origin 

cog
wikt:cosy
flounder
hug
lug
scree
snug
torsk, "codfish"
wicker

English words of Danish origin 
aquavit, "a clear Scandinavian liquor flavored with caraway seeds"
fjeld, "a barren plateau of the Scandinavian upland"
flense, "to strip of blubber or skin"
scrike, "shriek"
torsk, "codfish"
husband, “hus” is house in Danish, “bonde” is a type of farmer in Danish. Source: Kasper

English words of Norwegian origin 
aquavit, "a clear Scandinavian liquor flavored with caraway seeds"
brisling, "sprat"
fjord, "a narrow inlet of the sea between cliffs or steep slopes"
flense, "to strip of blubber or skin"
floe, "floating ice formed in a large sheet on the surface of a body of water"
gravlax, "salmon cured especially with salt, sugar, pepper, and dill and often additional ingredients (such as fennel, coriander, lime, and vodka or aquavit)"
klister, "a soft wax used on skis"
krill, "planktonic crustaceans and their larvae (order or suborder Euphausiacea and especially genus Euphausia) that constitute the principal food of baleen whales"
lemming, "any of various small short-tailed furry-footed rodents (such as genera Lemmus and Dicrostonyx) of circumpolar distribution that are notable for population fluctuations and recurrent mass migrations"
lefse, "a large thin potato pancake served buttered and folded"
lutefisk, "dried codfish that has been soaked in a water and lye solution before cooking"
scrike, "shriek"
ski, "one of a pair of narrow strips of wood, metal, or plastic curving upward in front that are used especially for gliding over snow"
slalom, "skiing in a zigzag or wavy course between upright obstacles (such as flags)"
telemark, "a turn in skiing in which the outside ski is advanced considerably ahead of the other ski and then turned inward at a steadily widening angle until the turn is complete"
torsk, "codfish"

See also 
List of English words of Old Norse origin
Lists of English words by country or language of origin
List of English words of Swedish origin

References 

Scandinavian
North Germanic languages